Tara George ( Coulterman;  born September 15, 1973 in Sault Ste. Marie, Ontario) is a Canadian curler from Thunder Bay. She formerly played third for the Krista McCarville rink.

George joined up with McCarville in 2005, when she added McCarville to her team that she skipped that included Lorraine Lang and Tiffany Stubbings.

George has won four Ontario provincial titles as a member of the McCarville rink. George took the 2010-11 season off to have a baby and was replaced by Ashley Miharija.

References

Canadian women curlers
Curlers from Northern Ontario
1973 births
Living people
Curlers from Thunder Bay
Sportspeople from Sault Ste. Marie, Ontario